The Southern Independent Schools (SIS), formed in 1978, is a group of 14 schools in Victoria, Australia.

History
In 1978, six southern independent secondary schools united to provide sporting competitions in swimming, cross country, athletics and weekly sport for students at their respective schools. In 1987 the association was officially and formally recognised as the Southern Independent Schools (SIS).

Schools

Current member schools

Former member schools

See also 
 List of schools in Victoria

External links
 
 Beaconhills College
 Flinders’ Christian Community College
 John Paul College
 Maranatha Christian School
 Nazareth College
 Padua College
 St Francis Xavier College
 St James College
 St John's Regional College
 St Leonards College
 St Peter’s College
 Woodleigh School

Australian schools associations
Australian school sports associations